The Embezzler is a 1914 American silent short drama film directed by Allan Dwan and featuring Lon Chaney, Pauline Bush and Murdock MacQuarrie. The film is now considered lost. A still exists showing Chaney in the J. Roger Dixon role.

Plot
John Spencer's daughter is completely unaware that her father has a criminal past. A seedy character named J. Roger Dixon attempts to blackmail the old man, threatening to tell his daughter the truth about her dad. After a while, Dixon becomes bolder and insists on marrying the young girl. The problem is she is already engaged to Arthur Bronson, a handsome young attorney. Dixon tells Spencer he must aid him in sullying the attorney's reputation, and Dixon hires two underworld thugs to help him frame Bronson as an embezzler.

Spencer's daughter overhears the criminals plotting and tells her father about the scheme to frame her fiance. At this point, Spencer confesses everything to his daughter and tells her how Dixon's been blackmailing him for years. Although Spencer's daughter is now aware of her dad's former misdeeds, Dixon now threatens to reveal the sordid story to the whole world unless the girl marries him. The young woman agrees to the marriage in order to save her father's reputation, but before the marriage can take place, Dixon is killed in a falling out between him and his two criminal compatriots. With Dixon dead, the young woman is now free to marry Arthur.

Cast
 Murdock MacQuarrie as John Spencer
 Pauline Bush as Pauline, his daughter
 Lon Chaney as J. Roger Dixon, a blackmailer
 William C. Dowlan as Arthur Bronson, the young attorney
 William Lloyd as William Perkins (Thug #1)
 Richard Rosson as Dick (Thug #2)
 Gertrude Short

Reception
"Moving Picture World" wrote "The plot is familiar in most of its details. The girl's father is in the power of the villain, played by Lon Chaney, who blackmails him at will...The story is well constructed, but not very fresh in subject matter." --

See also
List of lost films

References

External links

1914 films
1914 lost films
1914 drama films
1914 short films
Silent American drama films
American silent short films
American black-and-white films
Films directed by Allan Dwan
Lost American films
Lost drama films
Universal Pictures short films
1910s American films
1910s English-language films